Saint Marie may refer to:

 Saint Marie (manhwa)
 Saint Marie (fictional island), the setting of BBC's Death in Paradise

See also
 Mary (mother of Jesus)
 Sainte-Marie (disambiguation)
 Saint Mary (disambiguation)